John C. Carpenter (October 13, 1930 – November 19, 2016), was an American businessman, rancher, and politician.

Born in Fallon, Nevada, Carpenter graduated from White Pine High School in Ely, Nevada. In 1957, he bought a sheep ranch in Elko, Nevada where he lived with his wife and family. He served as president of the Nevada Woolgrowers Association. Carpenter served on the Elko County Commission. From 1987 to 2011, Carpenter served as a Republican member of the Nevada Assembly. He was a rancher, real estate broker, and businessman.

References

1930 births
2016 deaths
People from Fallon, Nevada
People from Elko, Nevada
Businesspeople from Nevada
Ranchers from Nevada
County commissioners in Nevada
Republican Party members of the Nevada Assembly
20th-century American businesspeople